You've Got to Stand for Something is the debut album of American country music artist Aaron Tippin. The title track was Tippin's first chart entry, peaking at #6 on the Billboard country charts in 1991. Also released from this album were "I Wonder How Far It Is over You" and "She Made a Memory out of Me", which reached #40 and #54, respectively.  The songs reached higher on the Radio and Records Country chart, reaching #5, #26, and #35, respectively.  "In My Wildest Dreams" would later be recorded by Kenny Chesney as the title track to his 1994 debut album In My Wildest Dreams.

Track listing

AOmitted from cassette version.

Personnel
Adapted from liner notes.

Sam Bush - fiddle (track 8)
Glen Duncan - fiddle
Paul Franklin - steel guitar (tracks 3, 4, 9)
Vince Gill - background vocals
Emory Gordy Jr. - bass guitar
John Barlow Jarvis - keyboards
Larrie Londin - drums, percussion
Brent Mason - electric guitar
Weldon Myrick - steel guitar (track 6)
Alan O'Bryant - background vocals
Mark O'Connor - mandolin, fiddle (tracks 2, 3, 4, 9)
Kayton Roberts - steel guitar
Aaron Tippin - lead vocals
Biff Watson - acoustic guitar

Charts

Weekly charts

Year-end charts

References

1991 debut albums
RCA Records albums
Aaron Tippin albums
Albums produced by Emory Gordy Jr.